Northdown is a locality and small rural community in the local government area of Latrobe in the North West region of Tasmania.
The 2016 census determined a population of 221 for the state suburb of Northdown.

History
The name "Northdown" was given to a large house built in the area for Mr. Edward Curr in 1827. The locality was gazetted in 1962.

Geography
Bass Strait forms the northern boundary.

Road infrastructure
The B74 route (Port Sorell Road) runs through the locality from west to east. Route C703 (Wrights Lane) starts at an intersection with B74 and runs south before exiting. Route C707 (Appleby Road) starts at an intersection with B74 and runs south-east before exiting.

References

Localities of Latrobe Council
Towns in Tasmania